
Calla's is a restaurant in The Hague, Netherlands. It is a fine dining restaurant that is awarded one Michelin star in 2002 and retained that rating until present.

In 2013, GaultMillau awarded the restaurant 16 out of 20 points.

Owner and head chef of Calla's is Ronald van Roon. The restaurant is a member of Les Patrons Cuisiniers.

See also
List of Michelin starred restaurants in the Netherlands

References 

Restaurants in The Hague
Michelin Guide starred restaurants in the Netherlands